Guangyayuan station, is a station on Line 10 of the Shenzhen Metro. It opened on 18 August 2020.

Station layout

Exits

References

Shenzhen Metro stations
Railway stations in Guangdong
Longgang District, Shenzhen
Railway stations in China opened in 2020